Archbishop Tenison's School, commonly known as Tenison's, is a Church of England mixed secondary school located in the London Borough of Lambeth.

Admissions
Tenison's is an 11–16 boys and girls comprehensive school, part of the educational provision of the Anglican Diocese of Southwark and the London Borough of Lambeth. The school caters for around 530 pupils. The school is located directly opposite The Oval cricket ground, home of Surrey County Cricket Club.

History
Thomas Tenison, an educational evangelist and later Archbishop of Canterbury, founded several schools in the late 17th and early 18th centuries. A boys' school now at the Oval was founded in 1685 in the crypt of St Martin's in the Fields and relocated by 1895 in Leicester Square on the site previously occupied by the Sabloniere Hotel. The school moved to The Oval in 1928, with the new building being opened by the then Prince of Wales (later King Edward VIII). A girls' school was formally established in 1706 for 12 girls and in 1863 a new school building was erected at 18 Lambeth High Street. The girls school closed in 1961, when it amalgamated with Archbishop Temple's Boys School to form a mixed voluntary aided (VA) school. The building was used by Temple's as a first-year annex from 1968 to 1974, when Archbishop Temple's School closed.  Archbishop Tenison founded another school in nearby Croydon in 1714.

Archbishop Tenison's at The Oval became a grammar school, then a comprehensive. Tenison's became a Grant-Maintained school in 1993, and a VA school in 1998. in 2019 the school converted to academy status.

School badge
The badges of both the schools founded by Thomas Tenison are based on his personal coat of arms, which consist of the arms of the see of Canterbury  impaling the Tenison family arms. The former, placed on the dexter side of honour,  are blazoned as: Azure, an archiepiscopal cross in pale or surmounted by a pall proper charged with four crosses patee fitchee  sable.  The arms of Tenison, placed on the sinister side of the escutcheon are blazoned as: Gules, a bend engrailed argent voided azure between three leopard's faces or jessant-de-lys azure.
In standard English: a red field bearing a white (or silver) diagonal band with scalloped edges, and a narrower blue band running down its centre. This lies between three gold heraldic lion's faces, each of which is pierced by a fleur-de-lys entering through the mouth.

Origin

These arms are a difference, or variant, of the mediaeval arms of the Denys family of Siston, Gloucestershire, (Gules, three leopard's faces or jessant-de-lys azure over all a bend engrailed of the last) and may have been adopted by the Tenison family because its name signifies "Denys's or Denis's son". The arms without the bend were originally those of the Norman de Cantilupe family, whose feudal tenants the Denys family probably were in connection with Candleston Castle in Glamorgan. St Thomas Cantilupe (d.1282), Bishop of Hereford, was the first to adopt these jessant-de-lys arms in place of his former arms of three fleurs-de-lys, visible on his seal. He gave a reversed (i.e. upside down) version of the new Cantilupe arms to the See of Hereford, which uses them to this day. A version of the Denys arms was also adopted by the family of the poet laureate Alfred, Lord Tennyson, not known to have been a descendant of Archbishop Thomas Tenison. The bend engrailed correctly "debruises" the leopard's faces, that is to say it is superimposed on them, as a heraldic difference. However this image was later on occasion "tidied-up" to show the bend passing between the leopard's faces, for example on a 17th-century mural monument to the Denys family in Pucklechurch Church.

Academic performance
The school has long been renowned for its high academic performance. It suffered a dip in results in 2016 and 2017 but the 2018 GCSE results show that the school is returning to its former achievements with double the number of strong GCSE passes in Maths and English and a large number of students attaining the new top grade 9 (equivalent to top half A*) in a range of subjects. In 2019 the school continued to show great improvement with a progress 8 score of -0.06,  which has moved the results to average compared to all other secondary schools in England.

In its Ofsted report, from October 2016, the school was judged to be Inadequate and was placed into special measures.

Notable Old Tenisonians (OTs)

 Carl Cort, footballer
 Leon Cort, footballer
 Jeremiah Emmanuel, youth influencer
 Jason Euell, footballer
 Patrick Harrington, political activist
 Barry Hayles, footballer
 Stephen Moore, actor
 Shaun Newton, footballer

Archbishop Tenison's Grammar School
 Nigel Anthony, aka Nigel "Nat" Gossling, actor
 Tony Banks, Baron Stratford, Labour MP from 1997–2005 for West Ham and from 1983-97 for Newham North West
 Nicky Clarke, celebrity hair stylist
 Stephen Conway, Bishop of Ely
 Cyril Easthaugh, Bishop of Peterborough
 Richard Findlater, journalist and author, and editor from 1961–85 of The Author
 Chris Gent, former Chief Executive Officer from 1997–2003 of Vodafone, and Chairman since 2005 of GlaxoSmithKline
 Don Letts, musician, member of Big Audio Dynamite
 Gary Olsen, actor
 Chris Riddell, award-winning illustrator, author, political cartoonist
 Ernest Whitfield, 1st Baron Kenswood, violinist

External links
 
 Old Tenisonians Association
 EduBase

The Oval
Boys' schools in London
Educational institutions established in the 1680s
Secondary schools in the London Borough of Lambeth
1685 establishments in England

Church of England secondary schools in the Diocese of Southwark
Academies in the London Borough of Lambeth